Northside Christian School may refer to:
 Northside Christian School (Westerville, Ohio)
 Northside Christian School (North Charleston, South Carolina)